Georgi Vladimirovich Smurov (born 29 May 1983) is a Russian former professional footballer.

Club career
He made his debut in the Russian Premier League in 2005 for FC Rostov.

External links
 

1983 births
Living people
People from Volzhsky, Volgograd Oblast
Russian footballers
FC Rostov players
Russian Premier League players
FC SKA Rostov-on-Don players
FC Volga Nizhny Novgorod players
FC Sokol Saratov players
FC Chernomorets Novorossiysk players
FC Taganrog players
FC Dynamo Saint Petersburg players
Association football midfielders
FC Avangard Kursk players
Sportspeople from Volgograd Oblast